The civil parish of Chalvington with Ripe, in the Wealden District of East Sussex, England, is made up of the two villages, Chalvington and Ripe. The civil parish was formed on 1 April 1999 from "Chalvington" and "Ripe" parishes.

History of the villages
The Romans built a road through the two villages, and remains of the layout can still be seen.

In medieval times the area had a profitable wool trade.

The villages

Chalvington
The village of Chalvington (Charnton in the traditional Sussex dialect) is named Calvintone or Caveltone in the Domesday Book of 1086. The name Chalvington, comes from the Saxon Caelfa's farm, and many local names derive from their occupation of the area.

There is one public house in the village, the Yew Tree Inn. The parish church is dedicated to St Bartholomew.

Ripe
Ripe is a village within the Wealden District of East Sussex, England. The two villages are adjacent to one another, Ripe ecclesiastical parish being the larger of the two in area. There is limited public transport to the village.

The village, in a mainly rural area, is mentioned in the Domesday Book and has had a number of names, including Alchitone, Achiltone, Achintone, Echentone and Eckington. The 13th-century parish church is dedicated to St John the Baptist. There is limited public transport to the village.

At the end of the Anglo-Saxon period it was owned by Earl Harold Godwinson, who become King Harold II and was killed at the Battle of Hastings in 1066. The Domesday Book mentions 'Rype' and 'Echentone' which were owned by Richer de Aquila (L'Aigle), and the church is also mentioned in Pope Nicholas IV's Taxatio Ecclesiastica of 1291, an ecclesiastical tax assessment survey.

The novelist Malcolm Lowry, best known for Under the Volcano, died at age 47 in a boarding house in Ripe on 27 June 1957. Lowry is buried in the village churchyard. Ripe was also the retirement home of the tattooed performer Horace Ridler (the Great Omi) who died there in 1969.

There was one public house, now closed.

References

Civil parishes in East Sussex
Wealden District